Teetatch Ratanasritai  (nicknamed Kaopun; born 29 May 1999) is a Thai singer and actor. He debuted in The Trainer. He graduated from Sangsom School. He planned to study at Srinakharinwirot University Prasarnmit Demonstration School (elementary/secondary).

Works

TV series

Sitcom

Film

References

External links
 ธีธัช รัตนศรีทัย - หนังดี
 instagram ข้าวปั้น ธีธัช รัตนศรีทัย

Teetatch Ratanasritai
Teetatch Ratanasritai
1999 births
Living people
Teetatch Ratanasritai